Sergey Viktorovich Diomidov (born 9 July 1943) is a Soviet former gymnast who competed in the 1964 Summer Olympics and in the 1968 Summer Olympics. He won team silver medals at both Games and a bronze on the vault in 1968.

He invented a skill on parallel bars.

Biography
Between 1961 and 1967, Diomidov trained at the Amy Forces Club in Tashkent, Uzbekistan. In 1968, he moved to Moscow where he was coached by Konstantin Karakashyants at the CSKA club. He retired in 1972 and holds a rank of lieutenant colonel.

Gymnastics competition history  

Apart from his Olympic team medals, he was part of two silver medal teams at world championships, in 1966 and 1970; at the 1966 championships, he also won the gold on parallel bars. In addition, he earned several medals at USSR and European championships.

Parallel bars skill

The "Diamidov" is a move on parallel bars.  It consists of a swing down from handstand, through support, then releasing one hand and twisting the body a full turn, before regrasping in handstand.  It is similar to the Stutz handstand, with the difference being that the Stutz involves a half turn only, but release of both hands.

References

External links

Diomidov(Parallel bars)
Video of a Diamidov, followed by a stutz handstand

1943 births
Living people
Uzbekistani male artistic gymnasts
Soviet male artistic gymnasts
Olympic gymnasts of the Soviet Union
Gymnasts at the 1964 Summer Olympics
Gymnasts at the 1968 Summer Olympics
Olympic silver medalists for the Soviet Union
Olympic bronze medalists for the Soviet Union
Olympic medalists in gymnastics
Medalists at the 1968 Summer Olympics
Medalists at the 1964 Summer Olympics
Medalists at the World Artistic Gymnastics Championships
Originators of elements in artistic gymnastics